The Our Lady of Most Holy Rosary Parish Church (Spanish: Iglesia Parroquial de Nuestra Señora del Santísimo Rosario), commonly known as Makinabang Church or Bisitang Pula, is a Roman Catholic Marian church in Barangay Makinabang, Baliuag, Bulacan, Philippines. On October 7 it is one of four Roman Catholic parish churches in the municipality and is the focus of one of its largest processions each year. The other nearby Baliuag parishes which bound the church are: Saint Augustine Church (Población); Holy Family Parish (Tangos); and Our Lady of Mount Carmel (Sabang). The church is also about 2 miles from its neighbor, Sub-Parish Church of Sto. Cristo in barangay Santo Cristo.

Makinabang Church is under the Vicariate of Saint Augustine of Hippo and belongs to the Roman Catholic Diocese of Malolos, a suffragan of the Archdiocese of Manila. Its incumbent team of priests in solidum moderator is parish priest (Judicial Vicar), Fr. Winniefred F. Naboya, JCL, who was formally installed on November 27, 2013. Fr. Naboya recently replaced the former Parish Administrator, the late Msgr. Macario R. Manahan, who succeeded the late Fr. Walderedo Castillo who died in 2008. The Parish Church's Vicar Forane is Msgr. Filemon M. Capiral, HP.

Etymology
Before the 1521-1898 Spanish colonization of the Philippines, Makinabang was already a settlement or sitio and the largest in Baliuag. When the Spanish friars, particularly the Augustinians, founded Saint Augustine Church in 1733, a Spanish mestizo introduced a wood sugarcane press to the area. The machine extracted panutsa (molasses), which the villagers mixed in with their coffee and other foods. Natives called the press makina (from the Spanish maquina), at which they would queue and abáng (Tagalog, "wait"). Those queuing would enquire "Marami pa bang nakaabang?" ("Are there many more waiting?), from which the word Makina-bang and eventually Makinabang was formed.

The chapel and its fence were originally painted red, for which reason the parish was called Bisitang Pula ("red chapel").

History

The church was built in 1941 with its patron Nuestra Señora del Santísimo Rosario (Our Lady of the Most Holy Rosary), a Marian title in relation to the Rosary. Devotion to the Virgin Mary under this title goes back to 1571 when Pope Pius V instituted "Our Lady of Victory" as an annual feast to commemorate the victory in the Battle of Lepanto. The victory was attributed to a rosary procession that day in St. Peter's Square in Rome for the success of the mission of the Holy League to hold back Muslim forces from overrunning Western Europe. In 1573, Pope Gregory XIII changed the title of this feast-day to "Feast of the Holy Rosary". in 1716 Pope Clement XI added the feast to the General Roman Calendar and assigned it to the first Sunday in October. Pope Pius X changed the date to October 7 in 1913, in his effort to restore celebration of the liturgy of the Sundays.

In 1940 the parish priests Pastor Luciano (d. 1985) suggested to Church authorities in Bulacan to build a small ermita or Kapilya. The new parish covered the Barangays of Tarcan, Santa Barbara, and even Taal and Santo Cristo in Pulilan, Bulacan. The small chapel is made of wood, nipa and light building materials, while its attached convento was made of nipa.

Fr. Jovito Reyes reconstructed the dilapidated chapel, adding concrete buttresses, including the walls, roof and convento. Wealthy residents, headed by Councilor Carmen Fernando García, Delfin Cruz and Salud S. Tesoro, helped build the new patio and grotto of the Sagrada Corazón and Our Lady of Lourdes.

Fr. Amador Wisco Cruz ("Amador" to parishioners) succeeded Fr. Jovito as parish priest on July 20, 1957. He bought the 4,000 sq.m. lot wherein the parishioners built the Parish Hall of the Cursillistas and Catholic Women's League. He is also known as the translator/editor of the most popular version of the Pasyón (Copyright 1949), the "Casaysayan nang Pasióng Mahal ni Jesucristong Panginoón Natin na Sucat Ipag-alab nang Pusò nang Sinomang Babasa". In the early 1990s, Fr. Expedito Caleon and Fr. Jess Cruz assisted the then ailing Fr. Amador, who died in 1992 after having served the parish for 35 years. Then came Fr. Ronald Ortega, Fr. Walderedo Castillo (d. 2008), and Msgr. Macario R. Manahan (d. 2013).

In preparation for its 75th Jubilee in October 2016, the Pastoral Council initiated repairs and improvements on the church building and its environs, under Fr. Winniefred F. Naboya, J.C.L.

On February 12, 2021. Rev. Fr. Nicanor Castro or simply "Fr. Nick", installed as the 6th Parish Priest.

References

Books 
Baliwag: Then and Now, by Roland E. Villacorte, Philippine Graphic Arts, Inc., Caloocan City, 1970, 1985 * 2001 editions. pp. 350–351 (2001 edition); and pp. 392–396 (1985 edition).
"Baliuwag, Lunduyan ng mga Bayani", Baliuag Tourism Council, 2008, Municipality of Baliuag, 2008 Edition, pp. 10–120.

Sources

The 2010–2011 Catholic Directory of the Philippines (published by Claretian Publications for the Catholic Bishops' Conference of the Philippines, June 2010)
 http://www.newadvent.org/cathen/15633c.htm

External links 
 

Roman Catholic churches completed in 1940
Roman Catholic churches in Bulacan
1940 establishments in the Philippines
Religious organizations established in the 1940s
20th-century Roman Catholic church buildings in the Philippines
Marian apparitions
Churches in the Roman Catholic Diocese of Malolos